The 2005 Men's Oceania Cup was the fourth edition of the men's field hockey tournament. It was held from 15–19 November in Suva, Fiji.

The tournament served as a qualifier for the 2006 FIH World Cup.

Australia won the tournament for the fourth time, defeating New Zealand 5–1 in the final.

Results
All times are local (UTC+12:00).

Pool

Matches

Final

Statistics

Final standings

Goalscorers

See also
2005 Women's Oceania Cup

References

2005
Oceania Cup
Oceania Cup
International sports competitions hosted by Fiji
Sport in Suva
21st century in Fiji
History of Suva
Oceania Cup
Oceania Cup